Manos may refer to:

Films
 The Hands (Spanish: Las manos), a 2006 Argentinean-Italian film
 Manos: The Hands of Fate, 1966 horror film

Music 
 Manos (band), German Black metal band
 Manos (album), by The Spinanes

Other uses
 Manos (name)
 Mano (stone) or manos, a stone tool used to grind and process food
 Manos: The Hands of Fate (video game), a 2012 video game based on the film
 Monte Manos, a mountain of Lombardy, Italy

See also 
 En Tus Manos (disambiguation)
 Mano (disambiguation)